Chiukepo Msowoya (born 23 September 1988) is a Malawian footballer who currently plays for Malawian side Mighty Wanderers FC and the Malawi national team.

Club career
Msowoya was the 2007 Malawi Premiere Division top scorer with 17 goals.

In January 2012, Msowoya joined Platinum Stars on loan until the end of the 2011–12 season.  Upon returning to Orlando Pirates, he and the club reached an agreement to part ways.  Msowoya returned to Malawi and joined his former club ESCOM United at the end August 2012.

He signed for Costa do Sol in February 2014.

On 19 January 2015, Chiukepo return home to join Big Bullets.

International career
Msowoya is a member of the Malawi national football team and participated at the 2010 Africa Cup of Nations in Angola.

International goals
Scores and results list Malawi's goal tally first.

References

External links

1988 births
Living people
People from Karonga District
Malawian footballers
Malawi international footballers
2010 Africa Cup of Nations players
Association football forwards
Malawian expatriate footballers
Expatriate footballers in Mozambique
Expatriate footballers in Rwanda
Expatriate soccer players in South Africa
Malawian expatriate sportspeople in Mozambique
Malawian expatriate sportspeople in Rwanda
Malawian expatriate sportspeople in South Africa
Red Lions FC (Malawi) players
ESCOM United FC players
Liga Desportiva de Maputo players
APR F.C. players
Orlando Pirates F.C. players
Platinum Stars F.C. players
C.D. Maxaquene players
CD Costa do Sol players
Nyasa Big Bullets FC players
Lamontville Golden Arrows F.C. players